Acer oligocarpum is an Asian species of maple. It has been found only in China (Tibet and Yunnan).

Acer oligocarpum is a small tree up to 12 meters tall, with gray bark. Leaves are non-compound, thick and a bit leathery, up to 14 cm wide and 4.3 cm across, egg-shaped or lance-shaped with no teeth or lobes. The leaves have a purple petiole.

References

External links
line drawing for Flora of China

oligocarpum
Plants described in 1979
Flora of Tibet
Flora of Yunnan